John Balliol ( – late 1314), known derisively as Toom Tabard (meaning "empty coat" – coat of arms), was King of Scots from 1292 to 1296. Little is known of his early life. After the death of Margaret, Maid of Norway, Scotland entered an interregnum during which several competitors for the Crown of Scotland put forward claims.  Balliol was chosen from among them as the new King of Scotland by a group of selected noblemen headed by King Edward I of England.

Edward used his influence over the process to subjugate Scotland and undermined Balliol's personal reign by treating Scotland as a vassal of England.  Edward's influence in Scottish affairs tainted Balliol's reign, and the Scottish nobility deposed him and appointed a Council of Twelve to rule instead. This council signed a treaty with France known as the Auld Alliance.

In retaliation, Edward invaded Scotland, starting the Wars of Scottish Independence. After a Scottish defeat in 1296, Balliol abdicated and was imprisoned in the Tower of London. Eventually, Balliol was sent to his estates in France and retired into obscurity, taking no more part in politics. Scotland was then left without a monarch until the accession of Robert the Bruce in 1306.  John Balliol's son Edward Balliol would later exert a claim to the Scottish throne against the Bruce claim during the minority of Robert's son David.

Name

In Scots he was known by the nickname , usually understood to mean "empty coat" in the sense that he was an ineffective king. Alternatively the word coat may refer to coat of arms; either to the Balliol arms which are a plain shield with an orle, also known as an inescutcheon voided or because his arms were stripped from his tabard in public.

Early life
Little of Balliol's early life is known. He was born between 1248 and 1250 at an unknown location; possibilities include Galloway, Picardy and Barnard Castle, County Durham. He was the son of John, 5th Baron Balliol, Lord of Barnard Castle (and founder of Balliol College, Oxford), and his wife Dervorguilla of Galloway, daughter of Alan, Lord of Galloway and granddaughter of David, Earl of Huntingdon—the brother of William the Lion. From his mother he inherited significant lands in Galloway and claim to Lordship over the Gallovidians, as well as various English and Scottish estates of the Huntingdon inheritance; from his father he inherited large estates in England and France, such as Hitchin, in Hertfordshire.

Accession as King of Scots

In 1284 Balliol had attended a parliament at Scone, which had recognised Margaret, Maid of Norway, as heir presumptive to her grandfather, King Alexander III. Following the deaths of Alexander III in 1286 and Margaret in 1290, John Balliol was a competitor for the Scottish crown in the Great Cause, as he was a great-great-great-grandson of David I through his mother (and therefore one generation further than his main rival Robert Bruce, 5th Lord of Annandale, grandfather of Robert the Bruce, who later became king), being senior in genealogical primogeniture but not in proximity of blood. He submitted his claim to the Scottish auditors with King Edward I of England as the administrator of the court, at Berwick-upon-Tweed on 6 June 1291. The Scottish auditors' decision in favour of Balliol was pronounced in the Great Hall of Berwick Castle on 17 November 1292, and he was inaugurated accordingly King of Scotland at Scone, 30 November 1292, St. Andrew's Day.

Edward I, who had coerced recognition as Lord Paramount of Scotland, the feudal superior of the realm, steadily undermined John's authority. He demanded homage to be paid towards himself, legal authority over the Scottish King in any disputes brought against him by his own subjects, contribution towards the costs for the defence of England, and military support was expected in his war against France.  He treated Scotland as a feudal vassal state and repeatedly humiliated the new king. The Scots soon tired of their deeply compromised king; the direction of affairs was allegedly taken out of his hands by the leading men of the kingdom, who appointed a Council of Twelve—in practice, a new panel of Guardians—at Stirling in July 1295.  They went on to conclude a treaty of mutual assistance with France—known in later years as the Auld Alliance.

Abdication
In retaliation for Scotland's treaty with France, Edward I invaded, commencing the Wars of Scottish Independence. The Scots were defeated at Dunbar and the English took Dunbar Castle on 27 April 1296. John abdicated at Stracathro near Montrose on 10 July 1296. Here the arms of Scotland were formally torn from John's surcoat, giving him the abiding name of "Toom Tabard" (empty coat).

John was imprisoned in the Tower of London until allowed to go to France in July 1299. When his baggage was examined at Dover, the Royal Golden Crown and Seal of the Kingdom of Scotland, with many vessels of gold and silver, and a considerable sum of money, were found in his chests. Edward I ordered that the Crown be offered to the shrine of St Thomas Becket at Canterbury, and that the money be returned to John for the expenses of his journey. But he kept the Seal himself. John was released into the custody of Pope Boniface VIII on condition that he remain at a papal residence. He was released around the summer of 1301 and lived the rest of his life on his family's ancestral estates at Hélicourt, Picardy.

Over the next few years, there were several Scottish rebellions against Edward (for example, in 1297 under William Wallace and Andrew Moray).  When Wallace was chosen as commander, he claimed to act in the name of his king, John Balliol.  This claim came to look increasingly tenuous, as John's position under nominal house-arrest meant that he could not return to Scotland nor campaign for his release, despite the Scots' diplomatic attempts in Paris and Rome. After 1302, he made no further attempts to extend his personal support to the Scots. Effectively, Scotland was left without a monarch until the accession of Robert the Bruce in 1306.

Death
John died in late 1314 at his family's château at Hélicourt in France. On 4 January 1315, King Edward II of England, writing to King Louis X of France, said that he had heard of the death of 'Sir John de Balliol' and requested the fealty and homage of Edward Balliol to be given by proxy.

A John de Bailleul is interred in the church of St Waast at Bailleul-sur-Eaune in Normandy. This may or may not be the Scottish king.

John was survived by his son Edward Balliol, who later revived his family's claim to the Scottish throne, received support from the English, and had some temporary successes.

Marriage and children

John married around 9 February 1281 to Isabella de Warenne, daughter of John de Warenne, 6th Earl of Surrey. Her mother, Alice de Lusignan, was niece of Henry III of England.  John was also an uncle to John Comyn, who was killed following a scuffle with Robert the Bruce in February 1306, in the chapel of the Greyfriars, Dumfries.

It has been established that John and Isabella had at least one child.

 Edward Balliol, Scottish pretender, (d.1364). Possibly married to Marguerite de Taranto, daughter of Philip I, Prince of Taranto (d. 1332) – annulled or divorced with no children.

However, other children have been linked to the couple as other possible issue:
 Henry de Balliol. He was killed in the Battle of Annan on 16 December 1332, leaving no children.
 Agnes (or Maud or Anne) Balliol was married to Bryan FitzAlan, Lord FitzAlan, and feudal Baron of Bedale. They were parents to Agnes FitzAlan (b. 1298), who married Sir Gilbert Stapleton, Knt., of Bedale (1291–1324). Gilbert is better known for his participation in the assassination of Piers Gaveston, Earl of Cornwall.
 Margaret Balliol. Married Sir John St Clere, Knight, of East Grinsted, Sussex, and left children, a daughter, Margaret, who married Sir William Wallis (or Waleys) of Glynde Place, Sussex.

Fictional portrayals
John Balliol has been depicted in drama:

John Balliol, An Historical Drama. In Five Acts (1825), play based on his life by William Tennant.
A character named Balliol, portrayed by British actor Bernard Horsfall, appears in Mel Gibson's 1995 Oscar-winning epic Braveheart, a largely fictional tale of Scottish national hero William Wallace. The character is merely presented as a claimant to the Scottish crown, with no further delving into his significance. He may be loosely based on John Balliol, although, in reality, Balliol was a prisoner in France at that time.

See also
 Scottish monarchs' family tree

References

Sources
 
 Rymer, Thomas, Foedera Conventions, Literae et cuiuscunque generis Acta Publica inter Reges Angliae. London. 1745. (Latin)

External links
 
 John Balliol at the official website of the British monarchy

|-

1249 births
1314 deaths
History of Galloway
John
People educated at Durham School
John Balliol
Prisoners in the Tower of London
Scottish people of the Wars of Scottish Independence
Competitors for the Crown of Scotland
13th-century Scottish monarchs
14th-century Scottish monarchs